Thai Massage  is a 2022 Indian Hindi-language comedy drama film written and directed by Mangesh Hadawale and produced by Imtiaz Ali and Bhushan Kumar.  It stars Gajraj Rao, Divyendu Sharma, Sunny Hinduja, Rajpal Yadav, Vibha Chibber and Alina Zasobina.  The film was released on 11 November 2022.

Plot
Atmaram Dubey is a middle-class 70-year-old widower who has remained celibate for decades. All of a sudden he starts suffering from erectile dysfunction, which leads to realization that he most likely will never have sex again. However, he wants to experience sex one last time. This awakening makes him embark an outrageous voyage of self-discovery that defies society standards.

Atmaram Dubey (Gajraj Rao) is a retired widower living in Ujjain. He is much loved and respected. He has been celibate for 22 years, because his wife (whom he loved deeply) was paralyzed and bedridden for 21 years, and she died a year ago. His family has gathered at the family home to celebrate his 70th birthday. In the middle of the festivities, the family gets a rude revelation that he not only he has a passport, he had recently gone on a secret Bangkok vacation as well. His children confront him, and then the film unspools in flashback as Atmaram shares his misadventures with his elder son (Sunny Hinduja). 

Beset by the onset of erectile dysfunction, Atmaram was hugely depressed. He's tried committing subside but was saved by Santulan (Dibyendu Sharma), who instigates him to give life another chance. He takes Atmaram to a 85 year old pehlwan, who advises daily exercise and eating 20 raw onions a day to cure the dysfunctio. This remedy works and Atmaram now has strong desire to do the deed one last time before the dysfunction comes back permanently. 

Santulan arranges for a prostitute for his "old" friend. When Atmaram chickens out of the arrangement, he then arranges for a passport and ticket to Bangkok for Atmaram to have a boom-boom time. There, a friendly Indian-origin taxi driver (Anil Charanjeett) guides him towards having a good time without getting duped. But Atmaram just can"t have meaningless sex. A chance encounter with a Russian travel blogger (Alina Zasobina) changes things. She takes him around town and even takes him to the famous Khao Sok lake where the two bond over the idea loneliness, being a good human being, and the fact that it's difficult for either of them to have sex with someone they do not have feeling for.  This bond helps them see what they need from each other and they end up having sex, as she is attracted to his innocence. 

This narration makes Atmaram's two sons realize that their father is a good human being, and just because he is old, it doesn't mean that he is not a human without emotions, needs, and desires. The family find closure, and Atmaram's children embrace him, which he cuts the cake celebrating his 70th birthday.

Cast
 Gajraj Rao as Atmaram Dubey
 Divyendu Sharma as Santulan Kumar
 Alina Zasobina as Rita
 Sunny Hinduja as Mukesh Dubey
 Rajpal Yadav as Jugnu Bhaiya
 Vibha Chhibber as Mrs. Panchal
 Anurita Jha as Anu Dubey
 Anamika Tiwari as Gungun
 Shashie Vermaa as Vakil Babu
 Aditi Arora as Saloni
 Chandan Anand as Kailash
 Anil Charanjeett as Jhandu Singh

Soundtrack 
Joi Barua composed all the songs except “Do You Wanna Boom Boom” which was composed by Amit Trivedi. All the lyrics were penned by Irshad Kamil.

Reception

References

External links
 
 

2022 films
2020s Hindi-language films 
2022 comedy-drama films